is a curry-flavored ramen noodle dish provided at many ramen restaurants in the cities of Muroran, Noboribetsu, Date, and Tōyako in Hokkaido, Japan.

Overview 

Muroran curry ramen was first created in 1965 at Ajinodaiō ramen restaurant in Muroran.

Characteristics
Muroran curry ramen typically contains thick ramen noodles made from Hokkaido wheat. The soup is both sweet and spicy and has a pork bone broth base. The dish is commonly topped with char siu, wakame, and bean sprouts.

Public relations 
The Muroran Curry Ramen Group was formed in 2006 to promote the style of ramen.

In 2010, Nissin Food Products launched a Muroran Curry Ramen instant noodle product nationwide under the supervision of the Muroran Curry Ramen Group.

New initiatives 

In 2015, Rantantei ramen restaurant in Muroran developed an original spice blend for customers wanting a spicier curry ramen.

See also
 List of ramen dishes

References

External links
 The Muroran Curry Ramen Group website 

Curry dishes
Hokkaido
Ramen dishes
1965 establishments in Japan